Krisztián Dóczi (born 19 November 1989 in Zalaegerszeg) is a Hungarian football player who currently plays for FC Ajka.

References 
HLSZ

1989 births
Living people
People from Zalaegerszeg
Hungarian footballers
Association football midfielders
Kaposvölgye VSC footballers
Lombard-Pápa TFC footballers
BKV Előre SC footballers
FC Ajka players
Nemzeti Bajnokság I players
Sportspeople from Zala County